Votsky Meneuz (Votyak Mänäweze) is a rural locality (a village) in Andreyevsky Selsoviet, Ilishevsky District, Bashkortostan, Russia. The population was 4 as of 2010. There are 2 streets.

Geography 
Votsky Meneuz is located 35 km north of Verkhneyarkeyevo (the district's administrative centre) by road. Mari-Meneuz is the nearest rural locality.

References 

Rural localities in Ilishevsky District